The women's 200 metre freestyle competition of the swimming events at the 2011 World Aquatics Championships was held on July 26 with the heats and the semifinals and July 27 with the final.

Records
Prior to the competition, the existing world and championship records were as follows.

Results

Heats
49 swimmers participated in 7 heats.

Swimoff
As two swimmers had the same time in the heats at place 16 they had to participate in a swimoff to determine the last semifinal swimmer.

Semifinals
The semifinals were held at 19:14.

Semifinal 1

Semifinal 2

Final
The final was held at 18:32.

References

External links
2011 World Aquatics Championships: Women's 200 metre freestyle start list, from OmegaTiming.com; retrieved 2011-07-23.

Freestyle 0200 metre, women's
World Aquatics Championships
2011 in women's swimming